Neutrons is the second studio album by the jazz band DK3. It was released in 1997 through Quarterstick Records.

Critical reception
The Chicago Tribune wrote that the album "has an urban, sometimes bleak film noir undertow ... the frenetic free jazz interplay between all members of the combo lift this CD a notch above previous outings." Ox-Fanzine called the album "dark, cacophonic city music for an imaginary city film." CMJ New Music Monthly wrote that Neutrons "has a consistent tension despite its dynamic range."

Track listing

Personnel 
Adapted from Neutrons liner notes.

The Denison/Kimball Trio
 Duane Denison – electric guitar, bass guitar
 Jim Kimball – drums, brushes, bongos
 Ken Vandermark – reeds
Additional musicians
 Tom Bickley – recorder (7)

Production and additional personnel
 Derek Michael Besant – illustrations
 The Denison/Kimball Trio – production
 Jeff Lane – mixing, recording

Release history

References

External links 
 

1997 albums
The Denison/Kimball Trio albums
Quarterstick Records albums
Instrumental albums